The 1979 Metro Conference men's basketball tournament was held March 1–3 at the Mid-South Coliseum in Memphis, Tennessee. 

Conference newcomers Virginia Tech defeated  in the championship game, 68–60, to win their first Metro men's basketball tournament.

The Hokies, in turn, received a bid to the 1979 NCAA Tournament. They would be joined in the NCAA field by regular season champions Louisville, who lost to Virginia Tech in the tournament's semifinal round.

Format
All seven of the conference's members participated in the tournament field. They were seeded based on regular season conference records, with the top team earning a bye into the semifinal round. The other six teams entered into the preliminary first round.

This was the first tournament for Virginia Tech, who joined the Metro Conference after playing as an Independent. They replaced Georgia Tech, who departed for the Atlantic Coast Conference prior to the season.

Bracket

References

Metro Conference men's basketball tournament
Tournament
Metro Conference men's basketball tournament
Metro Conference men's basketball tournament